Mohamed Hassan Ramees (born 8 November 1980) is a Sri Lankan footballer who plays as a defender for Sri Lankan club Blue Star and the Sri Lankan national team.

International career
Ramees made his senior international debut on 28 October 2007, playing in a 5–0 loss to Qatar in a first round match of the 2010 FIFA World Cup qualifiers (AFC).

See also
Football in Sri Lanka
List of football clubs in Sri Lanka

References

External links

1980 births
Living people
Sri Lankan footballers
Sri Lanka international footballers
Association football defenders
Blue Star SC players
Sri Lanka Football Premier League players